Alykhan Karmali is a businessman, entrepreneur, industrialist, and philanthropist in Uganda. He is the managing director of Mukwano Industries Uganda Limited, a member company of the Mukwano Group. He also served as a non-executive director of Exim Bank (Uganda), a commercial bank in which the Mukwano Group maintains 36.5 percent shareholding.

Background
Ali Mohamed Karmali, Alykhan's paternal grandfather, was an entrepreneur of Indian descent who migrated to Uganda circa 1904. He worked as a shop assistant in Jinja before shifting to Mbarara in Uganda's Western Region. Later, he settled in Bukandula in present-day Gomba District in the Buganda Region of Uganda, where "in partnership with other Asian families, he did a roaring trade in cotton and coffee". He had so many friends that he was locally nicknamed "Mukwano gwa Bangi" (Friend of Many). The family shortened it to "Mukwano" and named the family business after him. Amirali Karmali, Alikhan's father died on 10 July 2019 at Kololo, an upscale neighborhood in Kampala. He was buried in a cemetery in the same neighborhood, on Saturday 13 July 2019. In 1995, Amirali handed over the family business to his son, Alykhan.

See also
 List of wealthiest people in Uganda

References

External links
 Webpage of Mukwano Group
   Webpage of Exim Bank (Uganda)

Living people
Ugandan businesspeople
Ugandan Ismailis
1968 births
Ugandan bankers
Ugandan people of Indian descent
Ugandan businesspeople in real estate
Businesspeople in agriculture
Businesspeople in the hospitality industry